Thomas Speed (7 April 1843 – July 1896) was a Barbadian cricketer. He played in one first-class match for the Barbados cricket team in 1864/65.

See also
 List of Barbadian representative cricketers

References

External links
 

1843 births
1896 deaths
Barbadian cricketers
Barbados cricketers
People from Saint George, Barbados